Ȿ (lowercase: ȿ) is a Latin letter s with a "swash tail" (encoded by  Unicode, at codepoints U+2C7E for uppercase and U+023F for lowercase) that was used as a phonetic symbol by linguists studying African languages to represent the sound .

In 1931, it was adopted into the orthography of Shona for a 'whistled' s, but it was dropped in 1955 due to the lack of the character on typewriters and fonts. Today the digraph sv is used.

Notes and references

See also
ɀ
ʂ

S
S